Luis Enrique Robles Ramírez (born 22 September 1986), also known as Macue, is a Mexican professional footballer who plays as a centre-back for club Tepatitlán.

International career
Robles got his first call up to the senior Mexico side for matches against New Zealand and Panama in October 2016.

Honours
Tepatitlán
Liga de Expansión MX: Guardianes 2021
Campeón de Campeones: 2021

References

External links

1986 births
Living people
Atlas F.C. footballers
C.D. Veracruz footballers
Chiapas F.C. footballers
Club Puebla players
FF Jaro players
Liga MX players
Ascenso MX players
Ykkönen players
Footballers from Jalisco
Mexico youth international footballers
Association football central defenders
Mexico international footballers
Mexican footballers